Thyroid adenoma associated is a protein in humans that is encoded by the THADA gene.

References

Further reading 

Genes on human chromosome 2